Dotyville is a census-designated place (CDP) in Ottawa County, Oklahoma, United States. The population was 101 at the 2010 census.  Dotyville is a part of the Joplin, Missouri metropolitan area.

Geography
Dotyville is located on Oklahoma State Highway 10, just southwest of Miami across the Neosho River.

Demographics

As of the census of 2000, there were 17 people, 7 households, and 7 families residing in the CDP. The population density was 19.2 people per square mile (7.5/km2). There were 7 housing units at an average density of 7.9/sq mi (3.1/km2). The racial makeup of the CDP was 64.71% White, 29.41% Native American, and 5.88% from two or more races.

There were 7 households, out of which 28.6% had children under the age of 18 living with them, 100.0% were married couples living together, and 0.0% were non-families. No households were made up of individuals, and none had someone living alone who was 65 years of age or older. The average household size was 2.43 and the average family size was 2.43.

In the CDP, the population was spread out, with 11.8% under the age of 18, 5.9% from 18 to 24, 5.9% from 25 to 44, 52.9% from 45 to 64, and 23.5% who were 65 years of age or older. The median age was 50 years. For every 100 females, there were 88.9 males. For every 100 females age 18 and over, there were 87.5 males.

The median income for a household in the CDP was $58,750, and the median income for a family was $58,750. Males had a median income of $0 versus $41,250 for females. The per capita income for the CDP was $29,150. None of the population and none of the families were below the poverty line.

References

Census-designated places in Oklahoma
Census-designated places in Ottawa County, Oklahoma